, better known by his stage name of , is a Japanese actor, voice actor and narrator from Musashino, Tokyo. Mugihito was formerly credited under his birth name and also .

Filmography

Television animation
1976
Dokaben (Domon)

1978
Future Boy Conan (Many minor characters)

1979
Mobile Suit Gundam (Rose)

1980
Space Battleship Yamato III (Dagon)

1981
Dogtanian and the Three Muskehounds (Original Japanese version' WanWan Sanjushi) (Cardinal Richelieu)
Dr. Slump (Bubibinman)
Urusei Yatsura (Mendou's Father)

1982
Andromeda Stories (as "Makoto Terada") (Shopkeep)
Asari-chan Ai no Marchen Shōjo (Kanpachi)
Sasuga no Sarutobi (Torazô Demon)

1983
Ai Shite Knight (Kumahachi, Fujiki)
Armored Trooper Votoms (Kanzellman)

1984
The Super Dimension Cavalry Southern Cross (Rolf Emerson)

1986
Maison Ikkoku (Mitaka's Uncle)

1987
City Hunter (Announcer)

1990
Robin Hood (Richard I of England)

1992
Crayon Shin-chan (Shijuurou Ōhara)
Tekkaman Blade (Kouza Aiba)

1993
The Irresponsible Captain Tylor (Vice Admiral Mifune)

1994
Mobile Fighter G Gundam (Kyral Mekirel)

1995
Neon Genesis Evangelion (Seele Leader Keel Lorenz)

1996
City Hunter: The Secret Service (Gonzales)
Ijiwaru Baa-san (1996 edition) (Jun'ichi)

1997
One Piece (Tamago)

1998
Master Keaton (Victor)

1999
Betterman (Mugito Mamon)
Corrector Yui (Professor Inukai, Grosser)
Crest of the Stars (Former Baron Febdash Sluf)
Hoshin Engi (Kiyou)
Starship Girl Yamamoto Yohko (Zenger)

2000
Inuyasha (Spider Head)
Saiyuki (Jade Emperor)
Vandread (Grand Pa)

2001
Babel II (Yomi)
Baki the Grappler (Doppo Orochi)
Cyborg 009 (Dr. Gilmore)
Rune Soldier Louie (Carwess)
The SoulTaker (Daigo Tokisaka)

2002
Bomberman Jetters (Souto Bagura)
Mirmo! (Jidan)
Princess Tutu (Karon)
Seven of Seven (Rokuzo Suzuki)

2003
Papuwa (Itou, Kamui)
Someday's Dreamers (Kazuo Takahashi)

2004
Keroro Gunsō (Bob)
Kyo Kara Maoh! (Maxine)
Monkey Turn (Kanichi Koike)
Ragnarok: The Animation (Baphomet)
Rockman EXE Stream (Cardamon)
Tsukuyomi -Moon Phase- (Ryuuhei Midou)
Yu-Gi-Oh! Duel Monsters GX (Kagemaru)

2005
Basilisk: The Kouga Ninja Scrolls (Nankobo Tenkai)
Eureka Seven (Braya)
Honey and Clover (Professor Shouda)
Oh My Goddess! (Oshō)
Pani Poni Dash! (Alien Commander)
Patalliro Saiyuki! (God)

2006
Binbou Shimai Monogatari (Genzou Hayashi)
Crash B-Daman (Kyouju Toriga)
Gintama (Old Man)
Negima!? (Narration)
Shōnen Onmyōji (Abe no Seimei)
Souten no Ken (Old Kasumi Ramon)

2008
Ga-Rei: Zero (Naraku Isayama)
(Zoku) Sayonara, Zetsubou-Sensei (Otonashi Meru's father)
Strike Witches (Junzaburo Sugita)

2009
Fresh Pretty Cure! (Genkichi Momozono)
Umineko no Naku Koro ni (Kinzô Ushiromiya)

2012
Tamagotchi! (Mannenphiltchi)
The Ambition of Oda Nobuna (Dōsan Saitō)

2014
No Game No Life (Ino Hatsuse)
Space Dandy (Dr. H)
Tokyo ESP (Sukezaburou)

2015
Cute High Earth Defense Club Love! (Wombat, Mr Tawarayama)
Mobile Suit Gundam: Iron-Blooded Orphans (Togonosuke Makanai)

2016
Cute High Earth Defense Club LOVE! LOVE! (Wombat)
The Great Passage (Tomosuke Matsumoto)
Re:Zero − Starting Life in Another World (Old Man Rom)
Kamiwaza Wanda (Don Bugdez)

2017
Senki Zesshō Symphogear AXZ (Fudō Kazanari)

2019
Fairy Gone (Cain Distaroru)
Dr. Stone (Kaseki)
Kochoki: Wakaki Nobunaga (Hirate Masahide)
Senki Zesshō Symphogear XV (Fudō Kazanari)

2020
Jujutsu Kaisen (Yoshinobu Gakuganji)

2021
Peach Boy Riverside (Kiki)
How a Realist Hero Rebuilt the Kingdom (Albert Elfrieden)
Tesla Note (Jingo Negoro)

2022
Shinobi no Ittoki (Jūzen Jiraibо̄)

2023
Reborn to Master the Blade: From Hero-King to Extraordinary Squire (Old King Inglis)

ONA
JoJo's Bizarre Adventure: Stone Ocean (2022) (Kenzou)
Lupin III vs Cat's Eye (2023) (Sadatsugu Nagaishi)

OVA
Devil Hunter Yohko (1990) (Demon World Voice)
Dragon Knight (1991) (Dragon Knight Overlord)
Getter Robo Armageddon (1998) (Professor Saotome)
Iria: Zeiram the Animation (1994) (Puttubayh)
Kyokujitsu no Kantai (1997) (Shōin Tomimori)
JoJo's Bizarre Adventure (2001) (J. Geil)
The Day of Sigma (2005) (Sigma)
Seven of Seven (2002) (Rokuzo Suzuki)Urusei Yatsura (1985) (Mendou's Father)Vandread (2001) (Grand Pa)

Theatrical animationBe Forever Yamato (1980) (Kazan)Urusei Yatsura: Only You (1983) (Lum's Commander)Mobile Suit Gundam (1981) (Rose)Nausicaä of the Valley of the Wind (1984) (Mayor of Pejite)Urusei Yatsura 4: Lum the Forever (1986) (Mendou's Father)Tekkonkinkreet (2006) (The Boss)Ghost in the Shell: The Movie (2015) (Robert Lee)The Night Is Short, Walk on Girl (2017) (Ri Haku)Burn the Witch (2020) (Wolfgang Slashhaut)

TokusatsuIke! Ushiwaka Kotarou (1974) (yokai) (Name : Makoto Terada)Akumaizer 3 (1976) (Dracurda (ep. 20)) (Name : Makoto Terada)Shuriken Sentai Ninninger (2015) (Gengetsu Kibaoni (eps. 1 - 5, 13, 19, 34, 44 - 47)

Video gamesMortal Kombat 3 (1995), Narrator – Japanese PlayStation ReleaseMega Man X4 (1997), SigmaHeart of Darkness (1998), Master of DarknessAce Combat 3: Electrosphere (1999), Gilbert ParkGrowlanser III: The Dual Darkness (2001), Gerhard AuversJak and Daxter: The Precursor Legacy (2001), Red SageMega Man X6 (2001), Sigma, Metal Shark PlayerSkyGunner (2001), VentreSuper Robot Wars MX (2004), Kiral MekrialValkyrie Profile: Lenneth (2006), Ganossa, Jake Linas's Father, Lorenta's HusbandBioShock (2007), Sander CohenKane & Lynch: Dead Men (2007), LynchCastlevania: Lords of Shadow (2010), ZobekFate/Extra (2010), Dan Blackmore2nd Super Robot Wars Z (2011), Professor SaotomeTerror of the Stratus (2011), Takenosu IwaoAnarchy Reigns (2012), DouglasTales of Xillia 2 (2012), Rowen J. IlbertLego Marvel Super Heroes (2013), Professor XSonic Lost World (2013), Master ZikProject X Zone 2 (2015), SigmaKirby: Planet Robobot (2016), President HaltmannShin Megami Tensei IV: Apocalypse (2016), YHVHHorizon: Zero Dawn (2017), HADES

Dubbing roles

Live-action
Patrick StewartStar Trek: The Next Generation (Jean-Luc Picard second voice (after Kei Yoshimizu))Death Train (Malcolm Philpott)Star Trek Generations (Jean-Luc Picard)Star Trek: First Contact (Jean-Luc Picard)Star Trek: Insurrection (Jean-Luc Picard)X-Men (2003 TV Asahi edition) (Professor X)Star Trek: Nemesis (Jean-Luc Picard)X2 (2006 TV Asahi edition) (Professor X)The Game of Their Lives (Older Dent McSkimming)Mysterious Island (Captain Nemo)X-Men: The Last Stand (2009 TV Asahi edition) (Professor X)Logan (Charles Xavier)Dragonheart: Battle for the Heartfire (Drago)The Kid Who Would Be King (Old Merlin)Charlie's Angels (John Bosley)Star Trek: Picard (Jean-Luc Picard)
Ben KingsleyHouse of Sand and Fog (Colonel Massoud Amir Behrani)Thunderbirds (The Hood)The Dictator (Tamir)Ender's Game (Mazer Rackham)Iron Man 3 (Trevor Slattery)Robot Overlords (Robin Smythe)The Walk (Papa Rudy)Shang-Chi and the Legend of the Ten Rings (Trevor Slattery)The Addams Family (Fester Addams (Christopher Lloyd))Aliens (1992 VHS/DVD edition) (Bishop (Lance Henriksen))Aliens (1989 TV Asahi edition) (Sergeant Al Apone  (Al Matthews))Arachnophobia (Delbert McClintock (John Goodman))Baahubali: The Beginning (Kattappa (Sathyaraj))Baahubali 2: The Conclusion (Kattappa (Sathyaraj))Bill & Ted's Bogus Journey (Col. Oats (Chelcie Ross))The Blacklist: Redemption (Howard Hargrave (Terry O'Quinn))The Blues Brothers (1983 Fuji TV edition) (Reverend Cleophus James (James Brown))The Bodyguard (Old Man #2 (Karl Maka))Coming 2 America (Cleo McDowell (John Amos))Conan the Barbarian (1989 TV Asahi edition) (Rexor (Ben Davidson))The Crow (Top Dollar (Michael Wincott))CSI: Crime Scene Investigation (Jim Brass (Paul Guilfoyle))Cyborg (VHS edition) (Fender Tremolo (Vincent Klyn))Dances with Wolves (Timmons (Robert Pastorelli))Deep Rising (2000 TV Asahi edition) (Hanover (Wes Studi))Desperado (1998 TV Asahi edition) (Bartender (Cheech Marin))Die Hard (1990 TV Asahi edition) (Special Agent Johnson (Robert Davi))Die Hard 2 (Sergeant Al Powell (Reginald VelJohnson))Die Hard 2 (1994 TV Asahi edition) (Major Grant (John Amos))The Distinguished Gentleman (Elijah Hawkins (Charles S. Dutton))Doctor Sleep (Dick Hallorann (Carl Lumbly))Dr. Quinn, Medicine Woman (Robert E. (Henry G. Sanders))End of Days (Bobby Chicago (Kevin Pollak))Geronimo: An American Legend (Geronimo (Wes Studi))The Godfather (2001 DVD, 2008 Blu-ray and TV Tokyo editions) (Don Vito Corleone (Marlon Brando))The Golden Compass (Farder Coram (Tom Courtenay))Growing Pains (Sid (Kenneth Tigar))A History of Violence (Richie Cusack (William Hurt))It (2002 NHK Edition) (Pennywise the Dancing Clown (Tim Curry))Jurassic World (Hal Osterly (James DuMont))Kickboxer (Eric Sloane (Dennis Alexio))Kill Switch (The Coroner (Isaac Hayes))Knight Rider (K.A.R.R.)Last Action Hero (John Practice (F. Murray Abraham))The Last Castle (Jim Wheeler (Delroy Lindo))Licence to Kill (TV edition) (Franz Sanchez (Robert Davi))A Life Less Ordinary (2001 TV Asahi edition) (Jackson (Delroy Lindo))Lost (John Locke (Terry O'Quinn))The Lost World: Jurassic Park (Roland Tembo (Pete Postlethwaite))Mackenna's Gold (Old Adams (Edward G. Robinson))Mad Max 2 (1997 TV Asahi edition) (The Humungus (Kjell Nilsson))The Man Who Invented Christmas (Jacob Marley (Donald Sumpter))The Marine 2 (Church (Michael Rooker))Marked for Death (Max Keller (Keith David))The Matrix Reloaded (2006 Fuji TV edition) (Councillor Hamann (Anthony Zerbe))The Matrix Revolutions (2007 Fuji TV edition) (Councillor Hamann (Anthony Zerbe))Mission: Impossible (Jim Phelps (Peter Graves))Money Talks (Raymond Villard)The Mummy (Pharaoh Seti I (Aharon Ipalé))The Mummy Returns (Baltus Hafez (Alun Armstrong))My Own Private Idaho (Bob Pigeon (William Richert))Naked Gun : The Final Insult (Rocco Dillon (Fred Ward))The Next Karate Kid (Sergeant Keisuke Miyagi (Pat Morita))Night of the Living Dead (Harry Cooper (Tom Towles))Out for Justice (1994 TV Asahi edition) (Richie Madano (William Forsythe))The Peacemaker (Gen. Aleksandr Kodoroff (Aleksandr Baluev))Phenomena (2020 Blu-ray edition) (Professor John McGregor (Donald Pleasence))Platoon (1989 TV Asahi edition) (Rhah (Francesco Quinn))The Practice (Denny Crane (William Shatner))Predator (Mac Eliot (Bill Duke))The Princess Diaries 2: Royal Engagement (Joe (Héctor Elizondo))Rambo III (1994 TV Asahi edition) (Colonel Zaysen (Marc de Jonge))Raw Deal (1991 TV Asahi edition) (Max Keller (Robert Davi))Red Heat (1990 TV Asahi edition) (Viktor Rostavili / Viktor Rosta (Ed O'Ross))Remo Williams: The Adventure Begins (Conn 'Mac' MacCleary (J. A. Preston))RoboCop 3 (Kanemitsu (Mako))The Rock (2000 TV Asahi edition) (Ernest Paxton (William Forsythe))The Running Man (1990 TV Asahi edition) (William Laughlin (Yaphet Kotto))Scrooged (The Ghost of Christmas Past (David Johansen))Shoebox Zoo (Michael Scot (Peter Mullan))Single White Female (Mitch Myerson (Stephen Tobolowsky))Small Soldiers (Archer (Frank Langella))Star Wars: Episode I – The Phantom Menace (Watto (Andy Secombe))Star Wars: Episode II – Attack of the Clones (Watto (Andy Secombe))Street Fighter (Sagat (Wes Studi))Switchback (Bob Goodall (Danny Glover))Thank You for Smoking (Senator Ortolan Finistirre (William H. Macy))They Live (1990 TV Asahi edition) (Drifter/Collaborator (George Buck Flower))Top Gun (1989 Fuji TV edition) (LCDR Rick "Jester" Heatherly (Michael Ironside))Top Gun (2009 TV Tokyo edition) (CDR Tom "Stinger" Jordan (James Tolkan))Two Much (Gene (Danny Aiello))The Unknown Woman (Matteo (Alessandro Haber))The Untouchables (Al Capone (William Forsythe))V (Ham Tyler (Michael Ironside))The Wraith (1992 TV Asahi edition) (Sheriff Loomis (Randy Quaid))The Young Indiana Jones Chronicles (Remy Baudouin (Ronny Coutteure))Zack Snyder's Justice League (DeSaad (Peter Guinness))

AnimationAdventure Time (Gumbald)Baahubali: The Lost Legends (Kattappa)Batman: The Animated Series (Professor Hugo Strange)Cars (Sarge)Cars 2 (Sarge)Cars 3 (Sarge)Home on the Range (Jeb the Goat)Looney Tunes (The Tasmanian Devil)Monkey King: Hero Is Back (Old Monk)Pucca (Tobe, season 1)The Raccoons (Cyril Sneer)Ratatouille (Django)Spider-Man (Uncle Ben, Kingpin, Red Skull, others)Spider-Man and His Amazing Friends (Uncle Ben, Kingpin, Red Skull)X-Men'' (Toon Disney edition) (Red Skull)

References

External links
  
 

1944 births
Living people
Aoni Production voice actors
Japanese male child actors
Japanese male film actors
Japanese male stage actors
Japanese male television actors
Japanese male video game actors
Japanese male voice actors
Male voice actors from Tokyo Metropolis
People from Musashino, Tokyo
Production Baobab voice actors
20th-century Japanese male actors
21st-century Japanese male actors